The Lord Clive-class monitor, sometimes referred to as the General Wolfe class, were ships designed for shore bombardment and were constructed for the Royal Navy during the First World War.

Design
The slow progress of the war led to the need for more shore bombardment ships and various schemes for using spare heavy guns were considered. Heavier guns such as 13.5-inch and 15-inch weapons had no available mountings so the main armament consisted of a single twin  gun turret taken from decommissioned Majestic-class pre-dreadnought battleships.

The ships were ordered after the Abercrombie class had begun building and the hull form was a near repeat of that design. Extra quick-firing artillery for protection from destroyers and torpedo boats was also fitted in most ships and consisted of up to four six-inch guns.

Ships

18-inch conversions

The guns were mounted aft, permanently arranged to fire over the starboard beam. The mounting consisted of two massive side girders parallel to the barrel, between which the gun was slung. At the forward end was a support about which the gun could train in a limited arc, with a hydraulic cylinder providing ten degrees of traverse each side of the mounting center line. The gun was loaded at the fixed angle of 10 degrees, but firing was only allowed between 22 degrees and 45 degrees of elevation, to distribute the large firing forces evenly between the forward and after supports. The mounting was covered by a large non-traversing half-inch steel plate shield fixed to the deck.

The enormous rounds and charges were transported to the gunhouse on a light railway fixed to the main deck. Work was completed on two of the ships but the end of World War I intervened before Prince Eugene was finished. Both of the converted ships saw action. The original 12-inch turret was left in place on them to maintain stability.

General Wolfe fired on a railway bridge at Snaeskerke, four miles (6 km) south of Ostend, Belgium, on 28 September 1918. The range of 36,000 yards (33 km) made this the greatest range at which a Royal Navy vessel has ever engaged an enemy target using guns. Lord Clive fired a mere four rounds with the replacement gun at enemy targets.

The guns used were as follows:
 The gun from the rear turret of Furious was to have been fitted to Prince Eugene;
 The gun intended for the forward turret of Furious was fitted to General Wolfe;
 The gun fitted to Lord Clive was a spare.

Citations

Bibliography
  Vol. 1 • Vol. 2

Dittmar, F. J. & Colledge, J. J., "British Warships 1914-1919", (Ian Allan, London, 1972), 

 

 
Monitor classes
Ship classes of the Royal Navy